Eigil Ramsfjell (born 17 March 1955 in Oslo) is a Norwegian curler, world champion and Olympic medalist. Many consider him one of the pioneers in modern curling. He received a bronze medal as skip at the 1998 Winter Olympics in Nagano. He was skip on the gold winning team when curling was a demonstration event at the 1988 Winter Olympics in Calgary.

Ramsfjell is a three-time world champion, and has also received silver and bronze medals at the world championships.

His son, Magnus followed in his footsteps, and is a former World Junior bronze medalist; his daughter Maia is also a curler, Norwegian champion.

References

External links

 Video: 

Living people
1955 births
Sportspeople from Oslo
Norwegian male curlers
Olympic curlers of Norway
Curlers at the 1988 Winter Olympics
Curlers at the 1998 Winter Olympics
Olympic bronze medalists for Norway
World curling champions
Olympic medalists in curling
Medalists at the 1998 Winter Olympics
European curling champions
20th-century Norwegian people